Events from the year 1684 in art.

Events

Paintings

 Giovanni Antonio Burrini – Virgin with Saints Petronius and Dionysus the Areopagite
 Evert Collier – Self-Portrait with a Vanitas Still-life
 Englebert Fisen – The Crucifixion (St Bartholomew's Church, Liège)
 Aert de Gelder – The Jewish Bride (Esther Bedecked)
 Cornelis Dusart – Village Feast
 Fa Ruozhen – Cloudy Mountains 
 Willem van de Velde the Elder – The first battle of Schooneveld, 7 June 1673 (approximate date)

Births
 January 14 – Jean-Baptiste van Loo, Dutch painter (died 1745)
 April 25 – Marco Benefial, Italian, proto-Neoclassical painter, mainly active in Rome (died 1764)
 October 10 – Antoine Watteau, French painter (died 1721)
 November 30 – Andreas Møller, Danish portrait painter and pioneer of miniature painting (died 1762)

 date unknown
 Karl Aigen, German painter, master painter/tutor with Daniel Gran in Vienna (died 1762)
 George Bickham the Elder, English writing master and engraver (died 1758)
 Giovanni Angelo Borroni, Italian painter of the late-Baroque and early-Neoclassic periods, active mainly in Milan (died 1772)
 Serafino Brizzi, Italian engraver of the Baroque period (died 1724)
 Bian Shoumin, Chinese painter in Qing Dynasty (died 1752)
 Hendrik Frans van Lint, landscape painter from the Southern Netherlands (died 1763)
 George Vertue, English engraver and antiquary (died 1756)
 Odoardo Vicinelli, Italian painter of the late-Baroque period (died 1755)
 probable – Peter Tillemans, Flemish baroque painter, especially of portraiture, landscapes, and works on sporting and military subjects (died 1734)

Deaths
 January 15 – Caspar Netscher, Dutch portrait and genre works painter (born 1639)
 January 24 (buried) – Jan Wijnants, Dutch painter (born 1632)
 February 21 – Pieter van Abeele, Dutch medallist and coiner in Amsterdam (born 1608)
 March – Pieter de Hooch, Dutch painter (born 1629)
 April 26 – Jan Davidszoon de Heem, Dutch painter (born 1606)
 July 2 – Josefa de Óbidos, Spanish-born Portuguese painter (born 1630)
 October – Gerrit Battem, Dutch landscape painter (born 1636)
 probable
 Claude Audran the Younger, French painter (born 1639)
 Pietro Paolo Baldini, Italian painter (born 1614)
 Giovanni Battista Carlone, Italian painter active mainly in Genoa (born 1603)
 Muyan, Chinese Chan monk and calligrapher (born 1611)
 Abraham Myra, Finnish painter (born 1639)

References

 
Years of the 17th century in art
1680s in art